Gökmusa is a village in the Musabeyli District, Kilis Province, Turkey. The village is inhabited by Turkmens of the Çavuşlu tribe and had a population of 104 in 2022.

In late 19th century, German orientalist Martin Hartmann listed the village as a settlement of 15 houses inhabited by Turks.

References

Villages in Musabeyli District